Li Haojie (born 3 July 1993 in Yanji, Yanbian) is a Chinese footballer of Korean descent who currently plays for China League One side Sichuan Jiuniu.

Club career
Li Haojie started his professional football career in 2012 when he was promoted to China League One side Yanbian FC's first squad. On 26 June 2012, he made his senior debut in a 2012 Chinese FA Cup match which Yanbian lost to Dalian Shide 8–0. He committed a foul to concede a penalty in the match. On 20 April 2013, Li made his league debut in a 0–0 draw against Shenyang Shenbei. He played 19 league matches in the 2015 season as Yanbian won promotion to the Chinese Super League. On 2 April 2016, Li made his Super League debut in a 1–0 home victory against Beijing Guoan.

On 1 March 2019, Li transferred to China League Two side Yanbian Beiguo. On February 4, 2020, Yanbian Beiguo was disqualified for the 2020 China League Two due to its failure to hand in the salary and bonus confirmation form before the deadline. On 29 May he joined second tier football club Sichuan Jiuniu for the 2020 China League One season. He would make his debut in a league game on 13 September 2020 against Kunshan F.C. in a game that ended in a 2-0 defeat.

Career statistics
Statistics accurate as of match played 31 December 2020.

Honours

Club
Yanbian Funde
 China League One: 2015

References

External links
 

1993 births
Living people
Chinese footballers
People from Yanbian
Yanbian Funde F.C. players
Sichuan Jiuniu F.C. players
Chinese Super League players
China League One players
China League Two players
Chinese people of Korean descent
Association football midfielders